Suleyman or Süleyman is a variant of  Suleiman (the Arabic name ). It means "man of peace". Notable people with the name include:

Suleyman
Suleyman I of Rûm or Suleiman ibn Qutulmish (d. 1086), founder of an independent Seljuq Turkish state in Anatolia
Suleyman (mansa), mansa of Mali (1341–1360)
Sulayman al-Arabi, wali of Barcelona
Suleyman Shah (d. 1227 or 1228), grandfather of Osman I, founder of the Ottoman Empire
Chimene Suleyman, 21st-century UK-born US-based  writer

Süleyman
Süleyman Aktaş, Turkish serial killer
Süleyman Atlı (born 1994), Turkish freestyle sport wrestler
Süleyman Başak, Turkish economist
Süleyman Demirel, Turkish politician
Süleyman Fehim, Ottoman teacher and poet
Süleyman Genç (1944–2022), Turkish politician
Süleyman Nazif, Turkish poet
Süleyman Nuri (1895–1966), Ottoman Russian communist politician

See also
Suleiman